Jorge Zentner (born 1953) is an Argentine comic writer and the creator of the Dieter Lumpen character.

Biography
Zentner was born at Basavilbaso, Entre Ríos, Argentina, into a Jewish family.

After studying journalism and psychology, he worked as a reporter in Argentina. In 1977 he was forced to flee Argentina, and lived in Israel, Spain and France. He began his career as a comic writer in 1979; in 1981 he started a long  collaboration with Spanish artist Ruben Pellejero, with whom he realized most of his work. Comics produced by them include: Le Poignard d'Istambul (1986), Ennemis Communs (1988), Caraïbes (1990) and Le Prix de Charon (1994). Le Silence de Malka (1996) won the Angoulême International Comics Festival in 1997.

In 2000 he published the series Replay, in collaboration with artist David Sala. In 2003, together with Lorenzo Mattotti, he created Le Bruit du Givre.

References

Further reading
"El cómic español, premio a la mejor obra extranjera en Angulema". El País.

1953 births
Argentine expatriates in Israel
Argentine comics writers
Argentine Jews
Jewish Argentine writers
Spanish cartoonists
People from Entre Ríos Province
Living people
Argentine people of German-Jewish descent